The 1898 Chicago Orphans season was the 27th season of the Chicago Orphans franchise, the 23rd in the National League and the 6th at West Side Park. The Orphans, formerly known as the Colts, finished in fourth place in the National League with a record of 85–65, 17.5 games behind the Boston Beaneaters.

1898 was the first season since 1876 that the team was without manager and first baseman Cap Anson, who had been fired during the offseason. Cap, who was also often called "Pop", was replaced as manager by Tom Burns, who had played for the team from 1880 until 1891, and had managed the Springfield Ponies in 1897. The media, picking up on Anson's absence, began referring to the team as the "Orphans", as they had lost their "Pop".

Regular season

Season standings

Record vs. opponents

Roster

Player stats

Batting

Starters by position 
Note: Pos = Position; G = Games played; AB = At bats; H = Hits; Avg. = Batting average; HR = Home runs; RBI = Runs batted in

Other batters 
Note: G = Games played; AB = At bats; H = Hits; Avg. = Batting average; HR = Home runs; RBI = Runs batted in

Pitching

Starting pitchers 
Note: G = Games pitched; IP = Innings pitched; W = Wins; L = Losses; ERA = Earned run average; SO = Strikeouts

Other pitchers 
Note: G = Games pitched; IP = Innings pitched; W = Wins; L = Losses; ERA = Earned run average; SO = Strikeouts

References 
1898 Chicago Orphans season at Baseball Reference

Chicago Cubs seasons
Chicago Orphans season
Chicago Orphans